Franco Veronese (born 6 February 1952) is a former Italian male long-distance runner who competed at one edition of the IAAF World Cross Country Championships at senior level (1973).

References

1952 births
Living people
Italian male long-distance runners
Italian male cross country runners